The men's 200 metre breaststroke competition of the swimming events at the 2011 World Aquatics Championships was held on July 28 with the heats and the semifinals and July 29 with the final.

Records
Prior to the competition, the existing world and championship records were as follows.

Results

Heats
55 swimmers participated in 8 heats.

Semifinals
The semifinals were held at 18:56.

Semifinal 1

Semifinal 2

Final
The final was held at 19:33.

References

External links
2011 World Aquatics Championships: Men's 200 metre breaststroke start list, from OmegaTiming.com; retrieved 2011-07-23.

Breaststroke 200 metre, men's
World Aquatics Championships